Huascarayopsis is a genus of parasitic flies in the family Tachinidae. There is one described species in Huascarayopsis, H. paulensis.

References

Further reading

 
 
 
 

Tachinidae
Monotypic Brachycera genera
Articles created by Qbugbot